The Rue du Marché aux Fromages or Kaasmarkt (Dutch), meaning "Cheese Market Street", now also known by its nickname the Rue des Pittas or Pitastraat ("Pitta Street"), is a historic street in Brussels, Belgium, near the Grand-Place/Grote Markt (Brussels' main square). It is lined with numerous pitta bars, pizzerias and cocktail bars.

Two blind alleys come from this street: the / (currently the /), and the / (now called the /).

Toponymy
The / ("Cheese Market Street") used to be called the Smaelbeek in the 13th century. Then, it was renamed the / ("Coffin Street") before being changed back to its current name. It is today sometimes known under the moniker the / ("Pitta Street") due to the Greek restaurants found along it.

History
The oldest place-name would have been Smaelbeek (1234), after the artificial stream which, according to historians, flowed there. Nowadays, it thought to be more likely that the stream ran through the block between the Rue du Marché aux Fromages and the / and that the Smaelbeek referred to the latter street.

The market stalls apparently hindered the shops on the street. In 1509, the authorities had posts with the Burgundian Cross placed to limit their space. In 1615, butchers were allowed to participate in the market, with fines being imposed as a precaution against insults or fights. Carpenters and wood turners took over in the 18th century. Their chairs, ladders and coffins on display gave the street all kinds of nicknames, such as Leerestroet and Kistenstroet. The latter name was still in use in 1900, long after the coffins had been banned from the street.

In the 1970s, the street did not have a great reputation, with quite a few nightclubs and drugs. Greek immigrants brought about a revival by opening pitta bars, a concept that Belgians were completely unfamiliar with at the time. The first was Athens in 1979. By cooping up together, they were better able to attract the attention of tourists. In the 1990s, they invested in visual Hellenisation of the street. In order to respect the rules of the UNESCO zone, all neon signs, signboards, columns and caryatids were removed in 2012.

Notable houses
The street has many preserved old houses, most of which were rebuilt after the bombardment of Brussels in 1695. Some underwent major changes in the 19th century but without losing their original appearance. Notable examples include:
 Au Cheval Marin or Zeepeerd ("The Seahorse"). Currently no. 1, at the corner of the /. It has a door framing in the Louis XV style.
 Aux Troix Pages or Drij Pagekens ("The Three Pages"). Currently no. 5–7. It featured a facade which was recently stripped.
 Au Dragon de Fer or Den Eijseren Draeck ("The Iron Dragon"). Currently no. 15–17. Large house built in 1709 for Jean-Baptiste van Dievoet (1663–1751) and located on the right of the Impasse du Dragon. In the 18th century, its ground floor featured woodwork with recessed paintings and gilded leathers in the front room towards the street. On the facade hung an iron dragon as an ensign. The ground floor was totally transformed in 1882 into two commercial storefronts. This house's name finds its origin into the oldest history of Brussels since, according to legend, it is located at the same place where Saint Gaugericus defeated the dragon which was sowing terror on the territory that would become Brussels, and whose lair was located at this location near the Smaelbeek stream.
 No. 19: Considered the smallest house of Brussels, where the Impasse du Dragon starts.
 Au Chat or De Kat ("The Cat"). Currently no. 35, at the corner of the / where it is no. 43. Built in 1697.

See also

 List of streets in Brussels
 History of Brussels
 Belgium in "the long nineteenth century"

References

Notes

Streets in Brussels
City of Brussels